The membrane theory of shells, or membrane theory for short, describes the mechanical properties of shells when twisting and bending moments are small enough to be negligible.

The spectacular simplification of membrane theory makes possible the examination of a wide variety of shapes and supports, in particular, tanks and shell roofs. There are heavy penalties paid for this simplification, and such inadequacies are apparent through critical inspection, remaining within the theory, of solutions. However, this theory is more than a first approximation. If a shell is shaped and supported so as to carry the load within a membrane stress system it may be a desirable solution to the design problem, i.e., thin, light and stiff.

See also 
 Theory of plates and shells
 Stress resultants in plates and shells

References

Literature 
 
 Practical industry example for plates and shell analysis - animated video 

Scientific theories
Continuum mechanics